

320001–320100 

|-id=065
| 320065 Erbaghjolu ||  || Erbaghjolu is a commune in the Haute-Corse department of France on the island of Corsica. South of this village, 750 meters above sea level, is the Stelle di Corsica astronomical observatory. || 
|}

320101–320200 

|-id=153
| 320153 Eglitis ||  || Ilgmārs Eglītis (born 1951) was the head of the Baldone Observatory and director of the Institute of Astronomy of University of Latvia. || 
|}

320201–320300 

|-id=260
| 320260 Bertout ||  || Claude Bertout (born 1946), a French astronomer and long-time editor of Astronomy and Astrophysics. || 
|}

320301–320400 

|-bgcolor=#f2f2f2
| colspan=4 align=center | 
|}

320401–320500 

|-bgcolor=#f2f2f2
| colspan=4 align=center | 
|}

320501–320600 

|-bgcolor=#f2f2f2
| colspan=4 align=center | 
|}

320601–320700 

|-bgcolor=#f2f2f2
| colspan=4 align=center | 
|}

320701–320800 

|-id=790
| 320790 Anestin ||  || Victor Anestin (1875–1918), a Romanian journalist who popularized astronomy and sciences. || 
|}

320801–320900 

|-id=880
| 320880 Cabu ||  || Jean Cabut (Cabu, 1938–2015), a French comic strip artist and caricaturist.  || 
|}

320901–321000 

|-id=942
| 320942 Jeanette-Jesse ||  || Jeanette (1916–2014) and Jesse (1916–2014) Wasserman, parents of American discoverer Lawrence H. Wasserman || 
|}

References 

320001-321000